Samuli Tuomikoski (6 July 1875 – 28 October 1960) was a Finnish farmer and politician. He was born and died in Liminka, and was a member of the Parliament of Finland from 1929 to 1933, representing the National Coalition Party.

References

1875 births
1960 deaths
People from Liminka
People from Oulu Province (Grand Duchy of Finland)
National Coalition Party politicians
Members of the Parliament of Finland (1929–30)
Members of the Parliament of Finland (1930–33)
Finnish farmers